Daunte Rachard Culpepper (born January 28, 1977) is an American former professional football player who was a quarterback in the National Football League (NFL) for 11 seasons, primarily with the Minnesota Vikings. He played college football at UCF and was selected by the Vikings in the first round of the 1999 NFL Draft.

A three-time Pro Bowl selection during his seven seasons with the Vikings, Culpepper's most successful season came in 2004 when he set the single-season record for the most total yardage produced by an NFL quarterback. However, Culpepper suffered a serious knee injury the following season that ended his Vikings career. After his injury, he played sparingly in the NFL for the Miami Dolphins, Oakland Raiders, and Detroit Lions. His professional career concluded after one season with the Sacramento Mountain Lions of the United Football League (UFL).

Early years
Culpepper was born to a single mother, Barbara Henderson, who is the sister of former NFL linebacker Thomas "Hollywood" Henderson. While his mother was pregnant with him, she was serving time for armed robbery. Culpepper was adopted when he was a day old and raised as one of more than 15 children of the late Emma Lewis Culpepper, who worked in the correctional facility where his mother was held. They lived in Ocala, Florida, where Culpepper attended Vanguard High School. He played football, coached by  Alex Castaneda, one of five finalists for the 2000 NFL High School Football Coach of the Year Award, as well as basketball and baseball. After his senior season in 1994, he was named Mr. Football in the state of Florida. In 2007, Culpepper was named to the FHSAA's All-Century Team that listed the top 33 football players in the state of Florida's 100-year history of high school football.

Near the end of his high school team's state basketball championship game, the referee called traveling on Culpepper when he was driving for the game-winning lay-up. Later on in his career, Culpepper celebrated his football touchdowns by moving his hands in the motion that a basketball referee makes when calling traveling, also known as "the roll".

Culpepper was drafted in the 26th round (730th overall) by the New York Yankees in the 1995 Major League Baseball Draft but did not sign and chose to attend college.

College career
He struggled to get into college, because of low SAT scores. Marquee football schools, such as the University of Miami and University of Florida, backed off from recruiting him when it was assumed he would not qualify. The University of Central Florida, however, offered to tutor him and help him achieve the necessary scores, and he was able to qualify. Although the big college programs returned to recruit him, as a show of loyalty, Culpepper enrolled at UCF.

Although he had a love for baseball, Culpepper committed to play football at UCF as a quarterback. He rewrote virtually all of the school's quarterback records, approximately 30 in all, many held by Darin Slack since 1987. He also set an NCAA record for single-season completion percentage at 73.6%, breaking a 15-year-old mark set by Steve Young (71.3%). This record would stand until Colt McCoy (Texas) finished the 2008 season with a completion percentage of 77.6%.  Culpepper accomplished a feat equaled by only two others in NCAA history when he topped the 10,000-yard passing mark and the 1,000-yard rushing mark in his career. He finished his career sixth on the NCAA's all-time total offense list for all divisions with 12,459 yards and was responsible for 108 career touchdowns (84 passing).

After his junior season, he was being lured out of the collegiate ranks to enter the draft and join the NFL, but instead returned to UCF to play his senior year. UCF posted a 9–2 record, losing only to Purdue and Auburn.

NCAA statistics

Professional career

Pre-draft

Minnesota Vikings

Early career and immediate success

Culpepper was drafted 11th overall in the first round of the 1999 NFL Draft by the Minnesota Vikings; he was the fourth quarterback chosen, after Tim Couch (1st overall), Donovan McNabb (2nd) and Akili Smith (3rd). In his first year Culpepper played in one game, rushing three times for six yards and not throwing a pass.

In 2000 he was named Minnesota's starting quarterback. He led the Vikings to victory in the first seven games of the season, and helped them finish 11–5 and advance to the NFC Championship game, where they were beat by the New York Giants 41–0. During the season, Culpepper passed for 3,937 yards, 33 touchdowns and 16 interceptions. He also rushed for 470 yards and seven touchdowns. One of Culpepper's most notable moments was against the Buffalo Bills when he threw a pass across his body and the field to Randy Moss for a 39-yard touchdown pass, although the pass was at least 60 total yards. At the end of the year, he was selected to his first Pro Bowl. Randy Moss, wide receiver for the Vikings, said that Culpepper was one of the most talented quarterbacks he has ever seen following the 2000 season.

Struggles and comeback
Culpepper struggled over the next two seasons beginning in 2001 throwing 14 touchdowns to 13 interceptions. The Vikings finished the season 5–11. Culpepper started all 11 games in which he appeared, missing the final five games of the season with a knee injury he suffered in a game against the Pittsburgh Steelers on December 2. He completed 60 percent of his passes or better in nine of his 11 outings, including twice when he surpassed the 70.0 mark and had a passer rating of 100.0 better in two contests where the Vikings were 1–1 in those games. Culpepper's rushing total ranked third among NFL quarterbackss, trailing only Pittsburgh's Kordell Stewart (537) and Philadelphia’s Donovan McNabb (482). Perhaps his most notable performance during this campaign occurred during the 20–16 comeback win over the Tampa Bay Buccaneers.  On the run, Culpepper barreled into Derrick Brooks and Shelton Quarles, but was the first player up after the 8-yard score.

Culpepper continued to struggle in 2002, throwing 18 touchdowns to 23 interceptions and leading the Vikings to a 6–10 record. He also fumbled an NFL record 23 times, losing 9 of them. Some attribute this to his appearance on the cover of the Madden NFL 2002 video game, where he subsequently proceeded to have the worst year of his career until 2005, keeping with the superstition of the “Madden Curse”. Culpepper went on to win the EA Sports Madden Bowl title among NFL players during the 2003 offseason.

His ten rushing scores led all NFL QBs in 2002, and also marked the sixth-highest total by a QB in NFL history trailing only Cam Newton (14 for Carolina in 2011) and (12 for New England in 2020), Steve Grogan (12 for New England in 1976), Johnny Lujack (11 for Chicago in 1950), Tobin Rote (11 for Green Bay in 1956), Kordell Stewart (11 for Pittsburgh in 1997), and Kyler Murray (11 for Arizona in 2020).

Culpepper made a comeback in 2003, leading the Vikings to a 9–7 record, although they missed the playoffs. He passed for 3,479 yards, 25 touchdowns, and only 11 interceptions, and earned his second trip to the Pro Bowl.

Historic season
Culpepper enjoyed his best statistical season as a professional in 2004 and, though they were only 8–8, the Vikings reached the playoffs for the second time under Culpepper. Passing for a league-leading 4,717 yards, a Viking-record 39 touchdowns, and only 11 interceptions, Culpepper was named to his third career Pro Bowl. Culpepper also broke Dan Marino's NFL record for combined passing and rushing yards, amassing 5,123 total yards. His 2,323 rushing yards from 2000–2004 also made him only the fourth quarterback in NFL history to run for more than 2,300 yards in a five-season period. (Michael Vick had 3,570 from 2002–2006; Randall Cunningham had 3,232 from 1986–1990; and Steve McNair had 2,387 from 1997–2001). Culpepper’s career rushing average of 26.1 yards per game is fourth-best among quarterbacks in NFL history. Only Vick (47.3 yds/g), Cunningham (30.6 yds/g), and Bobby Douglass (29.8 yds/g) have averaged more rushing yards per game during their QB careers. After the 2004 season, Culpepper said the game had “slowed down” for him, saying

Injury
His first two games of the 2005 season were disappointments, as the Vikings went 0–2 while Culpepper threw no touchdown passes, eight interceptions, and fumbled twice. Culpepper rebounded in the third week, throwing for 300 yards and three touchdowns while beating the New Orleans Saints. In 2005, he had six touchdowns, twelve interceptions, and five fumbles before getting injured in the seventh game (only winning two games). On October 30, he suffered a knee injury during a 38–13 loss to the Carolina Panthers. Culpepper sustained damage to three of the four major ligaments in the knee: the ACL, PCL and MCL. He was placed on injured reserve and began rehabilitation treatment near his home in Florida. Backup Brad Johnson took over in the Carolina game and after losing that one, they won the next six straight games and the team ended up with a 9–7 record. Daunte's final career won–loss record as a starter for the Vikings was 37–40 (48.1% winning percentage).

On December 14, 2005, Culpepper and three other players were charged with indecent conduct, disorderly conduct and lewd or lascivious conduct for their involvement in the 2005 Minnesota Vikings boat cruise scandal, according to court papers and news reports. The maximum penalty they could have faced was 90 days in jail. His defense contended there was racial discrimination among the prosecution. On April 4, 2006, however, the charges against Culpepper were dropped owing to a lack of probable cause.

Culpepper was in negotiations with Zygi Wilf, the new owner of the Vikings, in regard to his contract with the team. Rumors surfaced that Culpepper was unhappy with his status in Minnesota due to the re-emergence of Brad Johnson following his injury. The Vikings wanted him to rehabilitate in Minnesota because they were not satisfied with his level of treatment in Florida. Culpepper refused this request.

Later on, Culpepper expressed his desire to be out of Minnesota. According to the Associated Press, Culpepper said that if he was not traded, he wanted to be released. Culpepper said Culpepper was not insistent on being traded to the Miami Dolphins, and orchestrated his trade without the services of his former agent. New Vikings coach Brad Childress likened his dealings with Culpepper to his dealings with Terrell Owens and said he never had a conversation with Daunte that did not involve his contract and getting more money instead of football and the team.

Miami Dolphins

Struggle to return from injury
Culpepper was traded to Nick Saban’s Miami Dolphins in exchange for a second-round draft pick. He changed his number from 11 (which he wore in Minnesota, after wearing #12 his rookie season in honor of Randall Cunningham) back to his original number 8, the same number he had at Vanguard High School and the University of Central Florida.

The Dolphins debated whether to pursue Culpepper or Drew Brees during the offseason. The Dolphins decided to bring in Culpepper based on a medical evaluation of the two players. Brees was coming back from a shoulder injury suffered the last game during the 2005 season.

Although still recovering from a serious knee injury the previous year, Culpepper was able to attend and participate in all of the Dolphins offseason practices, including training camp. In early August, he made it public that he felt his knee was only about 85–90% recovered. In his preseason game against Carolina he walked up to cornerback Chris Gamble and thanked him for injuring him, Daunte said if Gamble had not hit him like that he'd still be in Minnesota.

He was off to a rocky start in his first two regular-season games, losing both of them with fans booing Culpepper and calling for backup Joey Harrington in the second game. However, he had an improved performance in the third game, winning 13–10 over the Tennessee Titans who had the second to last ranked defense in the NFL. However, the next week the Houston Texans with the last ranked defense in the NFL won their first game of the season against the Dolphins.

At this point the Dolphins were 1–3 and their opponents were 1–11 when not playing Miami. After the Houston loss, Saban noticed Culpepper having trouble in practice due to a nagging bruised shoulder injury and decided to rest Culpepper for a couple of practices. During that Friday's practice, Culpepper and Saban got into a loud, heated argument during practice. Saban had decided to bench Daunte until his shoulder recovered and he got more of the mobility back that he lost due to his knee injury.

On November 30, 2006, Culpepper underwent arthroscopic surgery on his previously injured knee to remove a piece of loose cartilage that was causing Culpepper difficulty. On December 12, 2006, Culpepper was placed on injured reserve, officially ending his 2006 season. Saban stated that although Culpepper was making progress in his rehabilitation, he and the medical staff felt it would be difficult for Culpepper to play in the next three weeks.

On December 25, 2006, Steve Young appeared as a guest announcer during the Dolphins’ second to last game and criticized Culpepper's work ethic. Culpepper saw this on TV from his box suite at Dolphin Stadium and immediately walked down to the ESPN booth and waited for Steve Young to finish, then Daunte confronted Young about it and said he has not missed any meetings and that's not who he is. Young apologized and said though he heard Culpepper had been missing meetings he should have checked with Daunte first before repeating it. After the season Saban left for a head coaching job at the University of Alabama. On January 21, 2007, the South Florida Sun-Sentinel reported that despite public assertions by Saban, his decision to bench Culpepper actually had little to do with his knee and more to do with his head.

End of Culpepper era
In the absence of Culpepper, the Dolphins relied on quarterbacks Cleo Lemon and Gibran Hamdan, both of whom were considered unproven, and had, up to that point, combined for only a single regular season start. In the Dolphins’ initial mini-camp under first-year coach Cam Cameron, both the players struggled to move the offense. This poor performance led to an April 15 report that stated a much-discussed trade for Kansas City’s Trent Green was imminent, for Culpepper was unable to participate in the minicamp as he continued to recover from knee surgery. The weekend previous to the report, Culpepper revealed that the second surgery, which was designed to address scar tissue in the knee, was more serious than anyone originally divulged, and called for a rehabilitation period of 4–6 months. Culpepper said he has been told by his surgeon Dr. James Andrews to "begin to ease into things" after May 1.

On June 5, 2007, the Dolphins completed the long-awaited trade for Trent Green; a few hours before the Green trade became official, the Dolphins told Culpepper they “are going in a different direction at the QB position,” according to Culpepper, who resisted that plan.

On June 7, Culpepper, acting as his own agent, asked to be released from his contract with the Dolphins.

Culpepper was on the Dolphins' practice field for the start of a weekend minicamp on June 8, one day after asking for his release and two days after Miami completed a trade with Kansas City for Trent Green, who took over at quarterback.

Informed by quarterbacks coach Terry Shea that he would not be permitted to take part in any team drills during the Dolphins' June 8–10 minicamp, Culpepper stated that he would seek intervention from the NFL Players Association to end the stalemate. He was finally released by the Dolphins on July 17.

Oakland Raiders
Culpepper was first and most often linked to the Jacksonville Jaguars, but Jaguars head coach Jack Del Rio said he did not feel Culpepper would be a good fit. Culpepper worked out for the Tampa Bay Buccaneers soon after his release, but was not acquired by the team. On July 31, Culpepper signed a one-year contract with the Oakland Raiders, as an insurance policy by the Raiders as they struggled to sign number-one draft pick JaMarcus Russell, with whom they were engaging in contract negotiations. In 2007, Culpepper replaced the injured Josh McCown for the Raiders matchup against his former team, the Miami Dolphins. Culpepper finished the game with two passing and three rushing touchdowns. Culpepper started a total of six games for Oakland. Prior to the Week 13 game against the Denver Broncos, Culpepper was nursing a sore quadriceps. He said he suffered the injury during the Week 12 game against the Kansas City Chiefs but it did not begin to bother him until Wednesday. Some sources said he suffered the injury when he ran a race with Oakland cornerback Stanford Routt, a college sprinter, after practice but head coach Lane Kiffin declined knowledge of the alleged incident. Due to his injury, Culpepper did not play in another game that season and was placed on injured reserve on December 26.

2008 retirement and comeback
Culpepper visited the Green Bay Packers on April 23 and 24, 2008. He would later turn down the offer from the Packers, $1 million for a one-year contract, claiming the deal was not good. He said he was in contact with a few other teams. In July 2008, it was reported that the Detroit Lions were interested in signing Culpepper, but they never made an offer to him. He worked out with the Pittsburgh Steelers in August 2008, but the Steelers elected to sign Byron Leftwich instead to replace the injured Charlie Batch. On August 29, 2008, Culpepper then changed his mind and stated that he would consider a backup role in Green Bay if they were still interested in him, but the team did not put forth an offer.

On September 4, 2008, Culpepper announced his retirement. He expressed his frustrations with the NFL in a brief retirement letter. The main reason of his retirement was because he felt he could still be a starting quarterback in the NFL.

The Kansas City Chiefs had spoken to Culpepper about coming out of retirement for the 2008 season after Brodie Croyle was declared out for the season with an injury. On October 23, Culpepper stated through an email to Adam Schefter that he would come out of retirement and give the NFL another shot. On October 27, Culpepper told the Chiefs that he would not make another meeting with the team due to a “better opportunity with another team”.

Detroit Lions
On November 2, 2008, ESPN reported that he had agreed to terms on a two-year deal contract with the Detroit Lions and would join the team the following week. After passing a physical, Culpepper officially signed with the Lions on November 3. The Lions assigned Culpepper number 11, the number Roy Williams had worn before he was traded to Dallas on October 14. Culpepper played four games with the Lions before suffering a shoulder injury. On December 28, 2008, the Lions became the first team in NFL history to go 0–16. The only other teams since the AFL–NFL merger to have a winless season were the 1976 Tampa Bay Buccaneers, who went 0–14 (the NFL did not extend the schedule to 16 games until 1978), the 1982 Baltimore Colts, who went 0–8–1 during that strike-shortened season, and subsequently the 2017 Cleveland Browns, who went 1–31 over the 2016 and 2017 seasons.

2009
In an interview with Sirius NFL Radio, former Lions wide receiver Mike Furrey said he had heard through former Lions teammates that the Lions planned to make Culpepper the starter for the 2009 season.

On February 16, 2009, the Lions reached an agreement with Culpepper for a restructured deal that would keep him on the team in the second year of his two-year contract. He had been due a $2.5 million roster bonus later in February prior to the restructuring.

On September 7, 2009, it was reported first overall draft pick Matthew Stafford was named the starter for the Lions regular season opener against the Saints. During the preseason, Culpepper had suffered a foot injury. Culpepper said he will respect Matthew Stafford as the starter, but was not opposed to being traded.

On December 14, 2009, Culpepper played in what the Detroit Free Press headlined as “Lions suffer one of their biggest defeats in history.” Played in Baltimore, the Ravens won the game 48–3. In week 14, versus the Arizona Cardinals, Culpepper was benched in favor of third string quarterback Drew Stanton after a poor performance.

Sacramento Mountain Lions
Culpepper signed with the Sacramento Mountain Lions of the United Football League on June 7, 2010. The signing reunited Culpepper with Dennis Green, his former head coach in Minnesota, and Mike Kruczek, his former head coach at the University of Central Florida. Culpepper was named UFL Offensive Player of the Week, twice in the 2010 season. His best game came in week 2 beating the Florida Tuskers 24–20, throwing for 374 yards and 2 passing touchdowns and one rushing touchdown. In April 2011, Culpepper was placed on the protected players list, for the 2011 UFL season.

2011
On August 14, 2011, San Francisco 49ers head coach Jim Harbaugh announced that Culpepper was working out for the team on the following Monday to possibly add him to the 49ers roster. However, the 49ers opted to sign Culpepper's former Oakland Raider teammate Josh McCown instead.

Culpepper was named the 45th best quarterback of the modern era by Football Nation.

Career statistics

NFL statistics

UFL statistics

Awards and honors
2001 Vikings Ed Block Courage Award
2001 Best Breakthrough Athlete ESPY Award
2003 Extra Effort Award
2003 Korey Stringer Good Guy Award
2004 Korey Stringer Good Guy Award
2007 Week 4 AFC Offensive Player of the Week
2010 Week 2 United Football League Offensive Co-Player of the Week
2010 Week 7 United Football League Offensive Player of the Week

Other appearances
Culpepper appeared in an episode of George Lopez, along with Donovan McNabb. In the episode Culpepper is trying to recruit Jason McNamara, to play for Central Florida competing against McNabb who wants Jason to go to Syracuse.
 
Culpepper also appeared in the movie 50 First Dates, in the huddle and throwing a touchdown pass to Jim Kleinsasser when Sean Astin and Drew Barrymore were watching a football game.

Culpepper was a guest star at the 2013 Super Bash event hosted by NFL UK in London. Culpepper is represented by R. Totka of Athlete Promotions.

He also made cameos in several Cash Money music videos.

See also
Most consecutive games with at least five touchdown passes
Madden NFL Cover Athletes
Madden Curse

References

External links

 
 

1977 births
Living people
American adoptees
American football quarterbacks
Detroit Lions players
Miami Dolphins players
Minnesota Vikings players
Oakland Raiders players
Sacramento Mountain Lions players
UCF Knights football players
National Conference Pro Bowl players
Sportspeople from Ocala, Florida
Players of American football from Florida
African-American players of American football
People from Southwest Ranches, Florida
21st-century African-American sportspeople
20th-century African-American sportspeople
African American adoptees
Ed Block Courage Award recipients